Global Underground 026: James Lavelle, Romania is a DJ mix album in the Global Underground series, compiled and mixed by James Lavelle of UNKLE.   The album peaked at #14 on the Billboard Top Electronic Albums.

Another much anticipated return to GU duties as Lavelle defies preconceived ideas and turns in a predictably unpredictable, gloriously eclectic beats-driven mix. There is a welcome, liberal use of his own UNKLE tracks and a starring role for Meat Katie too.

Global in scope and Underground in vibe, GU026 continues the path of the series into the farther reaches of the international dancefloor.

Track listing

Disc one
James Lavelle - Beauty And... (Intro)  – 1:48
Queens of the Stone Age - No One Knows  – 5:38
UNKLE - In a State (Album Version)  – 6:11
PFN - Flow (False Prophet Mix)  – 4:12
UNKLE - Eye for an Eye (Silencer Mix)  – 5:17
Meat Katie - K Hole  – 6:43
UNKLE - Have You Passed Through This Night? (Eye for an Eye UNKLE Variation)  – 5:41
DJ Shadow featuring Roots Manuva - Gdmfsob (UNKLE Uncensored)  – 6:00
UNKLE - Reign (Album Version)  – 4:21
Meat Katie & Elite Force - Ju-Ju  – 6:14
Dylan Rhymes & Meat Katie & Elite Force - Dita Beater  – 4:16
Santos - Sabot (Evil Nine Mix)  – 3:11
South - Colours in Waves (UNKLE Reconstruction)  – 6:04
M83 & C'hantel - Run into Flowers (UNKLE Re-Prise)  – 4:12

Disc two
Plastikman - Ask Yourself (UNKLE Edit)  – 3:03
SCumdolly - Making Ends Meet  – 7:00
UNKLE - Invasion (Medway vs. Eva Coast to Coast Mix)  – 5:50
Peace Division - No More Subliminal Shit  – 4:31
Meat Katie meets Lee Coombs - Import  – 5:48
Meat Katie & Elite Force - Slagg  – 6:45
Ultima - Don't Funk  – 4:21
Pépé Bradock - 4  – 4:17
The Chemical Brothers featuring The Flaming Lips - Golden Path (Ewan Pearson's Rave Hell Dub)  – 5:00
Fred NuMF vs. Five Point O - Hong Kong Junkie (Medway Remix)  – 8:01
Alex Dolby - Psiko Garden (Sasha Re-Edit)  – 7:20
UNKLE & Derrick Carter - In a State (Sasha Remix)  – 8:53

References

External links 

Global Underground
2004 compilation albums